KZUS (92.3 FM, "US 92.3") is a radio station broadcasting a Regional Mexican format. Licensed to Ephrata, Washington, United States, the station is currently owned by Amador and Rosalie Bustos through its licensee Bustos Media Holdings, LLC, and features programming from Dial Global and Fox News Radio.

Bustos Media used to own the station. In September 2010, Bustos transferred most of its licenses to Adelante Media Group as part of a settlement with its lenders.

Effective December 10, 2014, Bustos Media repurchased KZUS from Adelante Media, along with eight other stations and a translator, for $6 million.

On December 31, 2014 KZUS changed their format from country to regional Mexican, branded as "La Zeta 92.3".

References

External links

ZUS
Mass media in Grant County, Washington
Radio stations established in 1982
1982 establishments in Washington (state)
Regional Mexican radio stations in the United States